is a Japanese football player. He plays for AC Nagano Parceiro.

Career
Genichi Endo joined J3 League club AC Nagano Parceiro in 2017.

Club statistics
Updated to 22 February 2019.

References

External links

1994 births
Living people
Sanno Institute of Management alumni
Association football people from Hokkaido
Japanese footballers
J3 League players
AC Nagano Parceiro players
Association football defenders